Medieval Moves: Deadmund's Quest (Medieval Moves in Europe) is a 2011 action adventure video game developed by San Diego Studio and Zindagi Games and published by Sony Computer Entertainment on November 15, 2011 in North America and November 18, 2011 in Europe for PlayStation 3, which utilizes PlayStation Move. It was officially announced at Electronic Entertainment Expo 2011 on June 5, 2011. The game is from the same team responsible for Sports Champions.

References

External links
 at PlayStation.com
 at zindagigames.com

2011 video games
Fantasy video games set in the Middle Ages
Fantasy video games
PlayStation 3 games
PlayStation 3-only games
PlayStation Move-compatible games
PlayStation Move-only games
Sony Interactive Entertainment games
Video games developed in the United States
Video games scored by David Bergeaud
Video games with stereoscopic 3D graphics
San Diego Studio games
Single-player video games